René Jules Thion de la Chaume (28 May 1877 – 3 January 1940) was a French fencer. He competed in the men's épée event at the 1900 Summer Olympics.

References

External links
 

1877 births
1940 deaths
French male épée fencers
Olympic fencers of France
Fencers at the 1900 Summer Olympics
People from Le Vésinet